Frederik Böhm (born 27 November 1985) is a German coxswain. He won a gold medal at the 2014 World Rowing Championships in Amsterdam with the lightweight men's eight.

References

1985 births
Living people
German male rowers
World Rowing Championships medalists for Germany
Coxswains (rowing)